

Events

Pre-1600
1339 – The Milanese army and the St. George's (San Giorgio) Mercenaries of Lodrisio Visconti clash in the Battle of Parabiago; Visconti is defeated.
1472 – Orkney and Shetland are pawned by Norway to Scotland in lieu of a dowry for Margaret of Denmark.
1521 – Juan Ponce de León sets out from Spain for Florida with about 200 prospective colonists.
1547 – Edward VI of England is crowned King of England at Westminster Abbey.

1601–1900
1685 – René-Robert Cavelier establishes Fort St. Louis at Matagorda Bay thus forming the basis for France's claim to Texas.
1792 – The Postal Service Act, establishing the United States Post Office Department, is signed by United States President George Washington.
1798 – Louis-Alexandre Berthier removes Pope Pius VI from power.
1813 – Manuel Belgrano defeats the royalist army of Pío de Tristán during the Battle of Salta.
1816 – Rossini's opera The Barber of Seville premieres at the Teatro Argentina in Rome.
1835 – The 1835 Concepción earthquake destroys Concepción, Chile.
1846 – Polish insurgents lead an uprising in Kraków to incite a fight for national independence.
1864 – American Civil War: Battle of Olustee: The largest battle fought in Florida during the war.
1865 – End of the Uruguayan War, with a peace agreement between President Tomás Villalba and rebel leader Venancio Flores, setting the scene for the destructive War of the Triple Alliance.
1872 – The Metropolitan Museum of Art opens in New York City.
1877 – Tchaikovsky's ballet Swan Lake receives its premiere at the Bolshoi Theatre in Moscow.

1901–present
1901 – The legislature of Hawaii Territory convenes for the first time.
1905 – The U.S. Supreme Court upholds the constitutionality of Massachusetts's mandatory smallpox vaccination program in Jacobson v. Massachusetts.
1909 – Publication of the Futurist Manifesto in the French journal Le Figaro.
1913 – King O'Malley drives in the first survey peg to mark commencement of work on the construction of Canberra.
1920 – An earthquake kills between 114 and 130 in Georgia and heavily damages the town of Gori.
1931 – The U.S. Congress approves the construction of the San Francisco–Oakland Bay Bridge by the state of California.
  1931   – An anarchist uprising in Encarnación, Paraguay briefly transforms the city into a revolutionary commune.
1933 – The U.S. Congress approves the Blaine Act to repeal federal Prohibition in the United States, sending the Twenty-first Amendment to the United States Constitution to state ratifying conventions for approval.
  1933   – Adolf Hitler secretly meets with German industrialists to arrange for financing of the Nazi Party's upcoming election campaign.
1935 – Caroline Mikkelsen becomes the first woman to set foot in Antarctica.
1939 – Madison Square Garden Nazi rally: The largest ever pro-Nazi rally in United States history is convened in Madison Square Garden, New York City, with 20,000 members and sympathizers of the German American Bund present.
1942 – World War II: Lieutenant Edward O'Hare becomes America's first World War II flying ace.
1943 – World War II: American movie studio executives agree to allow the Office of War Information to censor movies.
  1943   – The Saturday Evening Post publishes the first of Norman Rockwell's Four Freedoms in support of United States President Franklin Roosevelt's 1941 State of the Union address theme of Four Freedoms.
1944 – World War II: The "Big Week" began with American bomber raids on German aircraft manufacturing centers.
  1944   – World War II: The United States takes Eniwetok Atoll.
1952 – Emmett Ashford becomes the first African-American umpire in organized baseball by being authorized to be a substitute umpire in the Southwestern International League.
1956 – The United States Merchant Marine Academy becomes a permanent Service Academy.
1959 – The Avro Arrow program to design and manufacture supersonic jet fighters in Canada is cancelled by the Diefenbaker government amid much political debate.
1962 – Mercury program: While aboard Friendship 7, John Glenn becomes the first American to orbit the Earth, making three orbits in four hours, 55 minutes.
1965 – Ranger 8 crashes into the Moon after a successful mission of photographing possible landing sites for  the Apollo program astronauts.
1968 – The China Academy of Space Technology, China's main arm for the research, development, and creation of space satellites, is established in Beijing.
1971 – The United States Emergency Broadcast System is accidentally activated in an erroneous national alert.
1979 – An earthquake cracks open the Sinila volcanic crater on the Dieng Plateau, releasing poisonous H2S gas and killing 149 villagers in the Indonesian province of Central Java.
1986 – The Soviet Union launches its Mir spacecraft. Remaining in orbit for 15 years, it is occupied for ten of those years.
1988 – The Nagorno-Karabakh Autonomous Oblast votes to secede from Azerbaijan and join Armenia, triggering the First Nagorno-Karabakh War.
1991 – In the Albanian capital Tirana, a gigantic statue of Albania's long-time leader, Enver Hoxha, is brought down by mobs of angry protesters.
1998 – American figure skater Tara Lipinski, at the age of 15, becomes the youngest Olympic figure skating gold-medalist at the 1998 Winter Olympics in Nagano, Japan.
2003 – During a Great White concert in West Warwick, Rhode Island, a pyrotechnics display sets the Station nightclub ablaze, killing 100 and injuring over 200 others.
2005 – Spain becomes the first country to vote in a referendum on ratification of the proposed Constitution of the European Union, passing it by a substantial margin, but on a low turnout.
2009 – Two Tamil Tigers aircraft packed with C4 explosives en route to the national airforce headquarters are shot down by the Sri Lankan military before reaching their target, in a kamikaze style attack.
2010 – In Madeira Island, Portugal, heavy rain causes floods and mudslides, resulting in at least 43 deaths, in the worst disaster in the history of the archipelago.
2014 – Dozens of Euromaidan anti-government protesters died in Ukraine's capital Kyiv, many reportedly killed by snipers.
2015 – Two trains collide in the Swiss town of Rafz resulting in as many as 49 people injured and Swiss Federal Railways cancelling some services.
2016 – Six people are killed and two injured in multiple shooting incidents in Kalamazoo County, Michigan.

Births

Pre-1600
1358 – Eleanor of Aragon, queen of John I of Castile (d. 1382)
1469 – Thomas Cajetan, Italian philosopher (d. 1534)
1523 – Jan Blahoslav, Czech writer (d. 1571)
1549 – Francesco Maria II della Rovere, Duke of Urbino, last Duke of Urbino (d. 1631)
1552 – Sengoku Hidehisa, Daimyō (d. 1614)

1601–1900
1608 – Arthur Capell, 1st Baron Capell of Hadham (d. 1649)
1631 – Thomas Osborne, 1st Duke of Leeds, English politician, Treasurer of the Navy (d. 1712)
1633 – Jan de Baen, Dutch painter (d. 1702)
1705 – Nicolas Chédeville, French musette player and composer (d. 1782)
1726 – William Prescott, American colonel (d. 1795)
1745 – Henry James Pye, English poet and politician (d. 1813)
1748 – Luther Martin, American politician (d. 1826)
1751 – Johann Heinrich Voss, German poet, translator, and academic (d. 1826)
1753 – Louis-Alexandre Berthier, French general and politician, French Minister of Defence (d. 1815)
1756 – Angelica Schuyler Church, American socialite, sister-in-law to Alexander Hamilton (d. 1814)
1759 – Johann Christian Reil, German physician, physiologist, and anatomist (d. 1813)
1774 – Vicente Sebastián Pintado, Spanish cartographer, engineer, military officer and land surveyor of Spanish Louisiana and Spanish West Florida (d. 1829)
1784 – Judith Montefiore, British linguist, travel writer, philanthropist (d. 1862)
1792 – Eliza Courtney, French daughter of Georgiana, Duchess of Devonshire (d. 1859)
1794 – William Carleton, Irish author (d. 1869)
1802 – Charles Auguste de Bériot, Belgian violinist and composer (d. 1870)
1819 – Alfred Escher, Swiss businessman and politician (d. 1882)
1839 – Benjamin Waugh, English activist, founded the NSPCC (d. 1908)
1844 – Ludwig Boltzmann, Austrian physicist and philosopher (d. 1906)
  1844   – Joshua Slocum, Canadian sailor and adventurer (d. 1909)
1848 – E. H. Harriman, American businessman and philanthropist (d. 1909)
1857 – A. P. Lucas, English cricketer (d. 1923)
1866 – Carl Westman, Swedish architect, designed the Stockholm Court House and Röhsska Museum (d. 1936)
1867 – Louise, Princess Royal of England (d. 1931)
1870 – Jay Johnson Morrow, American engineer and politician, 3rd Governor of the Panama Canal Zone (d. 1937)
1874 – Mary Garden, Scottish-American soprano and actress (d. 1967)
1879 – Hod Stuart, Canadian ice hockey player (d. 1907)
1880 – Jacques d'Adelswärd-Fersen, French author and poet (d. 1923)
1882 – Elie Nadelman, Polish-American sculptor (d. 1946)
1887 – Vincent Massey, Canadian lawyer and politician, 18th Governor General of Canada (d. 1967)
1888 – Georges Bernanos, French soldier and author (d. 1948)
1889 – Hulusi Behçet, Turkish dermatologist and physician (d. 1948)
1893 – Elizabeth Holloway Marston, American psychologist and author (d. 1993)
1895 – Louis Zborowski, English race car driver and engineer (d. 1924)
1897 – Ivan Albright, American painter (d. 1983)
1898 – Ante Ciliga, Croatian politician, writer and publisher (d. 1992)
  1898   – Enzo Ferrari, Italian motor racing driver and entrepreneur, founder of Scuderia Ferrari and Ferrari (d. 1988)
1899 – Cornelius Vanderbilt Whitney, American businessman and philanthropist (d. 1992)

1901–present
1901 – René Dubos, French-American biologist and author (d. 1982)
  1901   – Louis Kahn, American architect, designed the Salk Institute, the Kimbell Art Museum and the Bangladesh Parliament Building (d. 1974)
  1901   – Muhammad Naguib, Egyptian general and politician, 1st President of Egypt (d. 1984)
  1901   – Ramakrishna Ranga Rao of Bobbili, Indian lawyer and politician, 6th Chief Minister of Madras Presidency (d. 1978)
1902 – Ansel Adams, American photographer and environmentalist (d. 1984)
1906 – Gale Gordon, American actor (d. 1995)
1912 – Pierre Boulle, French soldier and author (d. 1994)
  1912   – Johnny Checketts, New Zealand flying ace of the Second World War (d. 2006)
1913 – Tommy Henrich, American baseball player and sportscaster (d. 2009)
1914 – John Charles Daly, South African–American journalist and game show host (d. 1991)
1916 – Jean Erdman, American dancer and choreographer (d. 2020)
1918 – Leonore Annenberg, American businesswoman and diplomat (d. 2009)
1919 – James O'Meara, English soldier and pilot (d. 1974)
1920 – Karl Albrecht, German businessman, co-founded Aldi (d. 2014)
1921 – Buddy Rogers, American wrestler (d. 1992)
1923 – Victor G. Atiyeh, American businessman and politician, 32nd Governor of Oregon (d. 2014)
  1923   – Forbes Burnham, Guyanese lawyer and politician, 2nd President of Guyana (d. 1985)
  1923   – Rena Vlahopoulou, Greek actress (d. 2004)
1924 – Gloria Vanderbilt, American actress, fashion designer, and socialite (d. 2019)
1925 – Robert Altman, American director and screenwriter (d. 2006)
  1925   – Tochinishiki Kiyotaka, Japanese sumo wrestler, the 44th Yokozuna (d. 1990)
1926 – Matthew Bucksbaum, American businessman and philanthropist, co-founded General Growth Properties (d. 2013)
  1926   – Gillian Lynne, English ballerina, choreographer, and director (d. 2018)
  1926   – Richard Matheson, American author and screenwriter (d. 2013)
  1926   – Bob Richards, American Olympic track and field athlete (d. 2023)
  1926   – María de la Purísima Salvat Romero, Spanish Roman Catholic nun; later canonized (d. 1998)
1927 – Roy Cohn, American lawyer and political activist (d. 1986)
  1927   – Ibrahim Ferrer, Cuban singer and musician (d. 2005)
  1927   – Sidney Poitier, Bahamian-American actor, director, and diplomat (d. 2022)
1928 – Jean Kennedy Smith, American diplomat, 25th United States Ambassador to Ireland (d. 2020)
1929 – Amanda Blake, American actress (d. 1989)
1931 – John Milnor, American mathematician and academic
1932 – Adrian Cristobal, Filipino journalist and author (d. 2007)
1934 – Bobby Unser, American race car driver (d. 2021)
1935 – Ellen Gilchrist, American novelist, short story writer, and poet
1936 – Marj Dusay, American actress (d. 2020)
  1936   – Larry Hovis, American actor and singer (d. 2003)
  1936   – Shigeo Nagashima, Japanese baseball player and coach
1937 – Robert Huber, German biochemist and academic, Nobel Prize laureate
  1937   – Roger Penske, American race car driver and businessman
  1937   – Nancy Wilson, American singer and actress (d. 2018)
1939 – Herbert Kohler Jr., American businessman (d. 2022)
1940 – Jimmy Greaves, English international footballer and TV pundit (d. 2021)
1941 – Lim Kit Siang, Malaysian lawyer and politician
  1941   – Buffy Sainte-Marie, Canadian singer-songwriter and producer
1942 – Phil Esposito, Canadian ice hockey player, coach, and manager
  1942   – Mitch McConnell, American lawyer and politician
  1942   – Claude Miller, French director, producer, and screenwriter (d. 2012)
1943 – Antonio Inoki, Japanese wrestler, mixed martial artist, and politician (d. 2022)
  1943   – Mike Leigh, English director and screenwriter
1944 – Robert de Cotret, Canadian economist and politician, 56th Secretary of State for Canada (d. 1999)
  1944   – Lew Soloff, American trumpet player, composer, and actor (d. 2015)
  1944   – Willem van Hanegem, Dutch footballer and coach
1945 – Alan Hull, English singer-songwriter and guitarist (d. 1995)
1946 – Brenda Blethyn, English actress
  1946   – Sandy Duncan, American actress, singer, and dancer
  1946   – J. Geils, American singer-songwriter and guitarist (d. 2017)
1947 – Peter Osgood, English footballer (d. 2006)
  1947   – Peter Strauss, American actor and producer
1948 – Pierre Bouchard, Canadian ice hockey player and sportscaster
  1948   – Jennifer O'Neill, American model and actress
1949 – Eddie Hemmings, English cricketer
  1949   – Ivana Trump, Czech-American socialite and model (d. 2022)
1950 – Walter Becker, American singer-songwriter, guitarist, and producer (d. 2017)
  1950   – Peter Marinello, Scottish footballer
  1950   – Tony Wilson, English journalist and businessman (d. 2007)
1951 – Edward Albert, American actor (d. 2006)
  1951   – Gordon Brown, Scottish politician, Prime Minister of the United Kingdom
  1951   – Randy California, American singer-songwriter and guitarist (d. 1997)
  1951   – Phil Neal, English footballer and manager
1953 – Poison Ivy, American singer-songwriter, guitarist, and producer
1954 – Jon Brant, American bass player
  1954   – Anthony Head, English actor
  1954   – Patty Hearst, American actress and author
1957 – Glen Hanlon, Canadian ice hockey player and coach
1959 – Scott Brayton, American race car driver (d. 1996)
  1959   – David Corn, American journalist and author
  1959   – Bill Gullickson, American baseball player
1960 – Joel Hodgson, American comedian, actor, and screenwriter
  1960   – Cándido Muatetema Rivas, Equatoguinean politician and diplomat, Prime Minister of Equatorial Guinea (d. 2014)
1961 – Steve Lundquist, American swimmer
1962 – Dwayne McDuffie, American author, screenwriter, and producer, co-founded Milestone Media (d. 2011)
1963 – Charles Barkley, American basketball player and sportscaster
  1963   – Ian Brown, English singer-songwriter and musician
  1963   – Joakim Nystrom, Swedish tennis player
  1963   – Mariliza Xenogiannakopoulou, Greek lawyer and politician, Greek Minister of Health
  1963   – Cui Yongyuan, Chinese former anchor
1964 – Willie Garson, American actor and director (d. 2021)
  1964   – Tom Harris, Scottish journalist and politician
  1964   – Jeff Maggert, American golfer
  1964   – French Stewart, American actor
1966 – Cindy Crawford, American model and businesswoman
1967 – Paul Accola, Swiss alpine skier
  1967   – Kurt Cobain, American singer-songwriter and guitarist (d. 1994)
  1967   – David Herman, American comedian and actor
  1967   – Andrew Shue, American actor and activist, founded Do Something
  1967   – Lili Taylor, American actress
  1967   – Tom Waddle, American football player and sportscaster
1969 – Kjell Ove Hauge, Norwegian school principal and track and field athlete
  1969   – Siniša Mihajlović, Serbian footballer and manager (d. 2022)
  1969   – Danis Tanović, Bosnian director and screenwriter
1971 – Jari Litmanen, Finnish footballer
  1971   – Joost van der Westhuizen, South African rugby player (d. 2017)
1974 – Karim Bagheri, Iranian footballer and manager
1975 – Liván Hernández, Cuban baseball player
  1975   – Brian Littrell, American singer-songwriter and actor
1977 – Stephon Marbury, American basketball player
  1977   – Gail Kim, Canadian professional wrestler
1980 – Imanol Harinordoquy, French rugby player
  1980   – Luis Gabriel Rey, Colombian footballer
1981 – Tony Hibbert, English footballer
1982 – Jason Hirsh, American baseball player
1983 – Jose Morales, Puerto Rican-American baseball player
  1983   – Justin Verlander, American baseball player
1984 – Brian McCann, American baseball player
  1984   – Trevor Noah, South African comedian, actor, and television host
  1984   – Ramzee Robinson, American football player
1985 – Ryan Sweeney, American baseball player
  1985   – Julia Volkova, Russian singer and actress
  1985   – TJ Kirk, American YouTube personality and podcast host
1987 – Luke Burgess, English rugby league player
  1987   – Miles Teller, American actor
1988 – Kealoha Pilares, American football player
  1988   – Ki Bo-bae, South Korean archer
  1988   – Rihanna, Barbadian-American singer-songwriter and actress
  1988   – Jiah Khan, Indian singer and actress (d. 2013)
1989 – Daly Cherry-Evans, Australian rugby league player
1990 – Ciro Immobile, Italian footballer
1991 – Hidilyn Diaz, Filipino weightlifter
  1991   – Angelique van der Meet, Dutch tennis player
1992 – Kyle Turner, Australian rugby league player
1994 – Kateryna Baindl, Ukrainian tennis player
2003 – Olivia Rodrigo, American actress and singer

Deaths

Pre-1600
 789 – Leo of Catania, saint and bishop of Catania (b. 709)
 922 – Theodora, Byzantine empress
1054 – Yaroslav the Wise, grand prince of Veliky Novgorod and Kyiv (b. 978)
1154 – Saint Wulfric of Haselbury (b. c. 1080)
1171 – Conan IV, Duke of Brittany (b. 1138)
1194 – Tancred, King of Sicily (b. 1138)
1258 – Al-Musta'sim, Iraqi caliph (b. 1213)
1408 – Henry Percy, 1st Earl of Northumberland, English politician, Earl Marshal of the United Kingdom (b. 1342)
1431 – Pope Martin V (b. 1368)
1458 – Lazar Branković, Despot of Serbia
1513 – King John of Denmark, Norway, and Sweden (b. 1455)
1524 – Tecun Uman, Mayan ruler (b. 1500)
1579 – Nicholas Bacon, English politician (b. 1509)

1601–1900
1618 – Philip William, Prince of Orange (b. 1554)
1626 – John Dowland, English lute player and composer (b. 1563)
1762 – Tobias Mayer, German astronomer and academic (b. 1723)
1771 – Jean-Jacques d'Ortous de Mairan, French geophysicist and astronomer (b. 1678)
1773 – Charles Emmanuel III of Sardinia (b. 1701)
1778 – Laura Bassi, Italian physicist and scholar (b. 1711)
1790 – Joseph II, Holy Roman Emperor (b. 1741)
1806 – Lachlan McIntosh, Scottish-American general and politician (b. 1725)
1810 – Andreas Hofer, Tyrolean rebel leader (b. 1767)
1850 – Valentín Canalizo, Mexican general and politician. 14th President (1843–1844) (b. 1794)
1862 – William Wallace Lincoln, American son of Abraham Lincoln (b. 1850)
1871 – Paul Kane, Irish-Canadian painter (b. 1810)
1893 – P. G. T. Beauregard, American general (b. 1818)
1895 – Frederick Douglass, American author and activist (b. c. 1818)
1900 – Washakie, American tribal leader (b. 1798)

1901–present
1907 – Henri Moissan, French chemist and academic, Nobel Prize laureate (b. 1852)
1910 – Boutros Ghali, Egyptian educator and politician, 9th Prime Minister of Egypt (b. 1846)
1916 – Klas Pontus Arnoldson, Swedish journalist and politician, Nobel Prize laureate (b. 1844)
1920 – Jacinta Marto, Portuguese saint (b. 1910)
  1920   – Robert Peary, American admiral and explorer (b. 1856)
1933 – Takiji Kobayashi, Japanese writer (b. 1903)
1936 – Max Schreck, German actor (b. 1879)
1957 – Sadri Maksudi Arsal, Turkish scholar and politician (b. 1878)
1961 – Percy Grainger, Australian-American pianist and composer (b. 1882)
1963 – Jacob Gade, Danish violinist and composer (b. 1879)
1965 – Michał Waszyński, Polish film director and producer (b. 1904)
1966 – Chester W. Nimitz, American admiral (b. 1885)
1968 – Anthony Asquith, English director and screenwriter (b. 1902)
1969 – Ernest Ansermet, Swiss conductor (b. 1883)
1972 – Maria Goeppert-Mayer, German-American physicist and academic, Nobel Prize laureate (b. 1906)
  1972   – Walter Winchell, American journalist and actor (b. 1897)
1976 – René Cassin, French lawyer and judge, Nobel Prize laureate (b. 1887)
  1976   – Kathryn Kuhlman, healing evangelist, known for belief in Holy Spirit (b. 1907)
1981 – Nicolas de Gunzburg, French-American banker and publisher (b. 1904)
1987 – Wayne Boring, American illustrator (b. 1905)
1992 – A. J. Casson, Canadian painter (b. 1898)
  1992   – Dick York, American actor (b. 1928)
1993 – Ferruccio Lamborghini, Italian businessman, founded Lamborghini (b. 1916)
  1993   – Ernest L. Massad, American general (b. 1908)
1996 – Solomon Asch, American psychologist and academic (b. 1907)
  1996   – Audrey Munson, American model (b. 1891)
  1996   – Toru Takemitsu, Japanese pianist, guitarist, and composer (b. 1930)
1999 – Sarah Kane, English playwright (b. 1971)
  1999   – Gene Siskel, American journalist and critic (b. 1946)
2001 – Rosemary DeCamp, American actress (b. 1910)
  2001   – Donella Meadows, American environmentalist, author, and academic (b. 1941)
2003 – Mushaf Ali Mir, Pakistani air marshal (b. 1947)
  2003   – Maurice Blanchot, French philosopher and author (b. 1907)
  2003   – Orville Freeman, American soldier, lawyer, and politician, 29th Governor of Minnesota (b. 1918)
2005 – Sandra Dee, American actress (b. 1942)
  2005   – Josef Holeček, Czechoslovakian canoeist (b. 1921)
  2005   – John Raitt, American actor and singer (b. 1917)
  2005   – Hunter S. Thompson, American journalist and author (b. 1937)
2006 – Curt Gowdy, American sportscaster (b. 1919)
  2006   – Lucjan Wolanowski, Polish journalist and author (b. 1920)
2008 – Emily Perry, English actress and dancer (b. 1907)
2009 – Larry H. Miller, American businessman and philanthropist (b. 1944)
2010 – Alexander Haig, American general and politician, 59th United States Secretary of State (b. 1924)
2012 – Knut Torbjørn Eggen, Norwegian footballer and manager (b. 1960)
  2012   – Katie Hall, American educator and politician (b. 1938)
2013 – Kenji Eno, Japanese game designer and composer (b. 1970)
  2013   – David S. McKay, American biochemist and geologist (b. 1936)
  2013   – Antonio Roma, Argentinian footballer (b. 1932)
2014 – Rafael Addiego Bruno, Uruguayan jurist and politician, President of Uruguay (b. 1923)
  2014   – Walter D. Ehlers, American lieutenant, Medal of Honor recipient (b. 1921)
  2014   – Garrick Utley, American journalist (b. 1939)
2015 – Govind Pansare, Indian author and activist (b. 1933)
  2015   – Henry Segerstrom, American businessman and philanthropist (b. 1923)
  2015   – John C. Willke, American physician, author, and activist (b. 1925)
2016 – Fernando Cardenal, Nicaraguan priest and politician (b. 1934)
2017 – Vitaly Churkin, Ambassador of the Russian Federation to the United Nations (b. 1952)
  2017   – Mildred Dresselhaus, American physicist (b. 1930)
  2017   – Steve Hewlett, British journalist (b. 1958)
2020 – Joaquim Pina Moura, Portuguese Minister of Economy and Treasury and MP (b. 1952)
2021 – Nurul Haque Miah, Bangladeshi professor and writer (b. 1944)
  2021   – Mauro Bellugi, Italian footballer (b. 1950)

Holidays and observances 
Christian feast day:
Eleutherius of Tournai
Eucherius of Orléans
Francisco Marto and Jacinta Marto
Frederick Douglass (Episcopal Church (USA))
Wulfric of Haselbury
February 20 (Eastern Orthodox liturgics)
Day of Heavenly Hundred Heroes (Ukraine)
World Day of Social Justice

References

External links

BBC: On This Day

Historical Events on February 20

Days of the year
February